The Pro All Stars Series is a stock car racing governing body active in the United States of America and Canada. The series started in 2001 and now sanctions various series including North, South, and National Super Late Model tours and a New England Modified tour.

History
The Pro All Stars Series started with the PASS North Pro Stock in 2001. The class was founded by former stockcar racer Tom Mayberry. The series was a successor to the Northeast Pro Stock Association and International Pro Stock Challenge. The first race was held on 20 May 2001 at Lee USA Speedway. Jim McCallum qualified his car on pole position. Dale Shaw beat his 32 rivals in the race over 150 laps. Ben Rowe won six out of ten races in the season. But due to steady top five finishes Sam Sessions was the first series champion. Rowe won the next two titles in the series.

For 2004 a new raceclass was introduced. A 'touring style' modified racing series started at White Mountain Motorsports Park with ten drivers starting the race. PASS regular Ben Rowe won the first race of the series. A further two years later PASS founded the Super Late Model Touring Series South. The series, founded in 2006, was based in North Carolina but also raced on tracks in South Carolina, Virginia and other southern states.

Not all ventures of the Pro All Stars Series were highly successful. The PASS Outlaw Late Model series existed for three seasons. The championship was introduced as a breeding ground for new drivers before growing into the Super Late Models. The 2008 season saw very small grids. Nine drivers started the race at Speedway 95, twelve drivers started the race at Riverside Speedway. Mayberry stated that the economic situation and the fact that other local tracks added the outlaw late model class contributed to the small field in the PASS Outlaw Late Models. Therefore Mayberry decided to cancel the season after two races. The PASS Late Model Truck Series was also short lived. The trucks were a support category to the PASS South Super Late Models on short tracks throughout North Carolina. With only six drivers at Southern National Raceway Park the PASS organisation decided to cancel the series with one round at Greenville-Pickens Speedway remaining.

In late 2012 Mayberry bought the historic Oxford Plains Speedway. The track changed its focus from American Canadian Tour Late Model sanctioning to the PASS Super Late Model sanctioning. This also affected the showcase race at Oxford Plains, the Oxford 250. As of 2013 the race run under PASS rules and is a point-scoring race for the PASS North and National championships.

Champions

References

External links
 Official website

Auto racing series in Canada
Stock car racing series in the United States
Stock car racing
Motorsport in Canada
Stock car racing series
Auto racing series in the United States